Ralf Göthel is a former East German biathlete who won a silver medal at the Biathlon World Championships 1985 in Ruhpolding. He represented the sports club SG Dynamo Zinnwald / Sportvereinigung (SV) Dynamo.

References 

Year of birth missing (living people)
Living people
East German male biathletes
Biathlon World Championships medalists